Kopua yoko is a clingfish of the family Gobiesocidae.

References

yoko
Taxa named by Kyoji Fujiwara
Taxa named by Makoto Okamoto
Taxa named by Hiroyuki Motomura
Fish described in 2018